Cnemaspis anandani, Anandan's day gecko, is a species of diurnal, rock-dwelling, insectivorous gecko endemic to  India. It is distributed in Tamil Nadu.

References

 Cnemaspis anandani

anandani
Reptiles of India
Reptiles described in 2019